"Party Like a Rockstar" is a song by American hip-hop group Shop Boyz. It was released as their commercial debut single and also served as the lead single from their debut album Rockstar Mentality (2007). It reached huge success during mid-2007, namely in the United States, peaking in the top five of the Billboard Hot R&B/Hip-Hop Songs, Hot Rap Tracks, and Hot 100 charts. The song was nominated for Best Rap Performance by a Duo or Group at the 50th Grammy Awards.

For a time, "Party Like a Rockstar" was the most played rhythmic, and rap song in the United States, according to Radio & Records. In foreign countries, the song also gained airplay in the UK on BBC Radio 1, and was added to the B-List on its playlist.

Music and lyrics
The rap rock song was produced by Jason “Pit” Pittman. Lyrically the song makes references to prominent rock music figures such as Marilyn Manson, The Osbournes, Kiss, Queen, Bruce Springsteen, Red Hot Chili Peppers, and Travis Barker.

Music video
The music video for the song opens with a clip of the group performing doughnuts in a black 1968 Pontiac GTO. It then progresses to show the group performing at a crowded concert, with intercut clips of an actual rock band playing and clips of the group performing in a hotel room reminiscent of Avenged Sevenfold's hit song "Bat Country", both of which were directed by Marc Klasfeld. Cristal Athena Steverson from VH1's Flavor of Love and Flavor of Love Girls: Charm School, as well as LaLa Brown make cameo appearances in the video.

Chart performance
"Party Like a Rockstar" was a mid-charting hit in the United States as an airplay-only single. Confusion ensued, however, when a similarly titled song by hip hop artist Freak Nasty (who had his own hit a years earlier with Da' Dip) titled "Do It Just Like a Rock Star", was erroneously listed in the American iTunes Store with the title "Party Like a Rockstar".  This led to Freak Nasty's song, recorded in 2005, selling approximately 30,000 digital downloads even though his track was completely dissimilar.  In the Billboard issue dated May 26, 2007, the Shop Boyz were at number 54 on the Hot 100 due to heavy airplay while Freak Nasty was number 56 due to strong sales.  The following week, after the Shop Boyz had an official digital release of their single, "Party Like a Rockstar" shot to number two while Freak Nasty dropped completely off the chart. After its jump, "Party Like a Rockstar" managed to remain in the runner-up spot for a total of six weeks.

Critical performance

Nathan Rabin of The A.V. Club stated that the song was "one of my favorite guilty pleasures of the past few years: 'Party Like A Rockstar' by Shop Boyz, a hip-hop group whose conception of the rock-star mentality—which not so coincidentally is also the name of its debut album—began and ended with smashing guitars, staying up late, and saying 'totally' or 'dude' every other sentence."

Amid accusations of Freak Nasty taking advantage of the popularity of the Shop Boyz song, he responded in Billboard magazine's letters to the editor, stating in part, "I expect any artist that's signed to a major to do far better than any independent artist. Unlike Shop Boyz, I don't have a video.  I also don't have any radio play or marketing.  They do.  My song sounds totally different from theirs, and our names are distinctly different.  So how can consumers be confused?  I have much love and respect for Shop Boyz, and I would never do anything to block their shine."

Remixes
The song was officially remixed featuring verses from fellow hip hop rappers Lil Wayne, Jim Jones and Chamillionaire, with more guitar riffs included. Jones' verse however does not appear on the official iTunes release of the remix. A line from Lil Wayne's verse in this remix was later used in The Game's 2011 single "Martians vs. Goblins", with Lil Wayne being officially credited as a feature on the Game's track.

A unofficial remix was produced by crunk music legend Lil Jon. Additionally there were also "freestyles" recorded by hip hop rappers J. R. Writer of Dipset, Trina and Bow Wow.

In media
The song was featured in the video game NBA Live 08. The song was covered by Kidz Bop, but also featured in the 13th album.

Charts

Weekly charts

Year-end charts

Certifications

References

2007 songs
2007 debut singles
Shop Boyz songs
Universal Republic Records singles
Music videos directed by Marc Klasfeld